Farah Nadir is a Pakistani actress. She is known for her roles in dramas Raqs-e-Bismil, Hina Ki Khushboo, Malaal-e-Yaar, Bharosa Pyar Tera, Daldal, Ghisi Piti Mohabbat and Naqab Zan.

Early life
Farah was born on October 4th, 1965 in Karachi, Pakistan.

Career
She made her debut as an actress in the 1990s on PTV Channel. She first did modeling for commercials and advertisements. She soon got multiple offers from directors, she did three dramas on PTV, which got popular. She was noted for her roles in dramas Kiran, Bholi Bano, Noor-e-Zindagi, Tere Bina and Hina Ki Khushboo. She also appeared in drama Daldal along with Muneeb Butt, Zahid Ahmed, Armeena Khan also with Kinza Hashmi and Haara Dil with Danish Taimoor and Hiba Bukhari. Since then she appeared in dramas Raqs-e-Bismil, Dulhan, Bharosa Pyar Tera, Phaans and Ghisi Piti Mohabbat.

Personal life
Farah is married and has three children and actress Sana Nadir is her daughter.

Filmography

Television series

Web series

Telefilm

Film

References

External links
 
 

1965 births
Living people
20th-century Pakistani actresses
Pakistani television actresses
21st-century Pakistani actresses
Pakistani film actresses